Federation Council may refer to:
 Federation Council (Russia), the upper house of the Federal Assembly of Russia
 Federation Council (RSFSR) (1990–1991)
 Federation Council (USSR) (1990–1991)
 Federation Council (SFRY) (1963–1974)
 Federation Council (Star Trek), an organization in the fictional Star Trek universe
 Federation Council, New South Wales, a local government area in Australia

See also
 Council of the Federation, an organization made up of the premiers of Canada's thirteen provinces and territories
 Federal Council (disambiguation), a list of organizations named "Federal Council"